Middle March or Middle Marches may refer to:
Central March, historical subdivision of Muslim Iberia
Middle March, a historical part of Scottish Marches
Mittelmarch, a fictional place in The City in the Autumn Stars by Michael Moorcock
Mittelmark, region in the March Brandenburg

See also
Middlemarch (disambiguation)